Eddy Besong, known by the stage name of Eddy Bee AKA Mr R&B, is a Cameroonian Afrobeat and RnB artist.

He has been in the music scene since 2009, releasing a mixtape in 2010 as part of a trio group called Avinu C including Naomi  Achu and H Bolo. He later on pursued a solo career as Eddy Bee.
Eddy Bee released his critically acclaimed debut album “The Eddy Bee Show” in November 2018.

Discography 
 "I want to marry you"(2014)
 "Thank you"(2016)
 "I Do"(2016)

References

Living people
Afrobeat musicians
Rhythm and blues musicians
Cameroonian musicians
Year of birth missing (living people)